Hugo Salabio (born 8 June 1999) is a French professional rugby league footballer who last played as a  forward for the Catalans Dragons in the Super League.

He previously played for Toulouse Olympique in the Betfred Championship.

In 2022, he made his Catalans debut in the Super League against the Wigan Warriors.

References

External links
Catalans Dragons profile

2000 births
Living people
Catalans Dragons players
Toulouse Olympique players
French rugby league players
Rugby league props